

Events

January–March 
 January 1 – William Lloyd Garrison begins publishing The Liberator, an anti-slavery newspaper, in Boston, Massachusetts.
 January 10 – Japanese department store, Takashimaya in Kyoto established.
 February–March – Revolts in Modena, Parma and the Papal States are put down by Austrian troops.
 February 2 – Pope Gregory XVI succeeds Pope Pius VIII, as the 254th pope.
 February 5 – Dutch naval lieutenant Jan van Speyk blows up his own gunboat in Antwerp rather than strike his colours on the demand of supporters of the Belgian Revolution.
 February 7 – The Belgian Constitution of 1831 is approved by the National Congress.
February 8 – French-born botanical explorer Aimé Bonpland leaves Paraguay for Argentina. 
 February 14 – Battle of Debre Abbay: Ras Marye of Yejju marches into Tigray, and defeats and kills the warlord Sabagadis.
 February 25 – Battle of Olszynka Grochowska (Grochów): Polish rebel forces divide a Russian army.
 March 10 – The French Foreign Legion is founded.
 March 16 – Victor Hugo's historical romantic Gothic novel Notre-Dame de Paris, known in English as The Hunchback of Notre-Dame, is published in Paris.
 March 29 – The Bosnian uprising (1831–32) against the Ottoman Empire begins.

April–June 
 April 7 – Pedro I abdicates as Emperor of Brazil in favor of his 5-year-old son Pedro II, who will reign for almost 59 years.
 April 18
 The University of Alabama is founded.
 The Sydney Morning Herald newspaper is first published, as the Sydney Herald.
 April 27
 Charles Albert becomes king of Sardinia after the death of King Charles Felix.
 Ending of the First Anglo-Ashanti War (1823–1831).
 May 26 – Battle of Ostrołęka: The Poles fight another indecisive battle.
 May 31 – Auxiliary paddle steamer Sophia Jane arrives at Sydney from London, becoming the first steamboat to operate in the coastal waters of New South Wales.
 May–June – Merthyr Rising: Coal miners and others riot in Merthyr Tydfil, Wales, for improved working conditions.
 June 1 – British Royal Navy officer James Clark Ross locates the position of the North Magnetic Pole, at this time on the Boothia Peninsula.
 June 21 – The North Carolina State House and Canova's George Washington are destroyed by fire in Raleigh, North Carolina.

July–September 
 July 13 – Russian imperial officials in Wallachia adopt Regulamentul Organic, introducing a period of unprecedented reforms that provide for Westernization of this region of Romania.
 July 15 – The volcanic Graham Island briefly emerges in the Mediterranean.
 July 21 – Leopold of Saxe-Coburg-Gotha is inaugurated as the first King of the Belgians, in Brussels.
 August 2 – The Dutch Ten Days' Campaign against Belgium is halted by a French army.
 August 7 – American Baptist minister William Miller preaches his first sermon on the Second Advent of Christ in Dresden, New York, launching the Advent Movement in the United States.
 August 21 – Nat Turner's slave rebellion in the United States breaks out in Southampton County, Virginia.
 August 29 – Michael Faraday demonstrates electromagnetic induction at the Royal Society of London. Joseph Henry recognises it at about the same time.
 September 6–8 – Battle of Warsaw: The Russians take the Polish capital and crush resistance.
 September 8 – Coronation of King William IV of the United Kingdom (he will reign until 1837).
 September 22 – The House of Commons of the United Kingdom passes the Great Reform Bill to expand the franchise, but this is later defeated in the House of Lords.
 September 26–28: The first national presidential nominating convention is held in the United States, by the Anti-Masonic Party in Baltimore, Maryland.

October–December 
 October 9 – Ioannis Kapodistrias, Greek head of state and founder of Greek independence, is assassinated in Nafplion.
 October 21 – The November Uprising ends in the defeat of Polish forces.
 October 28 – Michael Faraday constructs an early form of dynamo.
 October 29 – The 1831 Bristol riots ("Queen Square riots") in Bristol (England) begin, in connection with the Great Reform Bill controversy. Quelled by the authorities and the military on October 31, 100 city centre properties are destroyed, at least 120 are estimated to have been killed, 31 of the rioters will be sentenced to death and a colonel facing court-martial for failure to control the riot commits suicide.
 October 30 – In Southampton County, Virginia, escaped slave Nat Turner is captured and arrested for leading the bloodiest slave rebellion in United States history.
 November 7 – Slave trading is forbidden in Brazil.
 November 17 – Ecuador and Venezuela are separated from Gran Colombia.
 November 22 – First Canut Revolt: After a bloody battle with the military causing 600 casualties, rebellious silk workers seize Lyon, France.
 December 26 – Global financial services business Assicurazioni Generali is founded in Trieste (at this time in the Austrian Empire) as Imperial Regia Privilegiata Compagnia di Assicurazioni Generali Austro-Italiche.
 December 27
 The Baptist War (Christmas Rebellion) begins in Jamaica, with the setting afire of the Kensington House in St James Parish, inspiring thousands of black slaves to revolt against their British masters. At its peak, more than 20,000 people will be involved, and more than 500 killed.
 Charles Darwin embarks from Plymouth on the second voyage of HMS Beagle which will be the foundation for his life of scientific study. 
 December 31 – Gramercy Park is deeded to New York City.

Date unknown 
 Egyptian–Ottoman War (1831–1833): Muhammad Ali of Egypt's French-trained forces occupy Syria.
 Scholar Rifa'a at-Tahtawi returns from study in Paris to Egypt, where he will participate in the Nahda.
 Founding of:
 Denison University in Granville, Ohio
 New York University in New York City
 Wesleyan University in Middletown, Connecticut
 Xavier University in Cincinnati (as "The Athenaeum")
 Wallinska skolan, the first secondary school for girls in the Swedish capital of Stockholm.

Births

January–June 

 January 3 – Savitribai Jyotirao Phule, Indian social reformer, poet (d. 1897)
 January 7 – Heinrich von Stephan, German postal union organizer (d. 1897)
 January 11 – Pope Cyril V of Alexandria (d. 1927)
 January 26 – Heinrich Anton de Bary, German botanist, mycologist (d. 1888)
 February 12 – Myra Bradwell, American lawyer, political activist (d. 1894)
 February 24 – Leo von Caprivi, Chancellor of Germany (d. 1899)
 March 3
 Gioacchino La Lomia, Italian Roman Catholic priest and venerable (d. 1905)
 George Pullman, American inventor and industrialist (d. 1897)
 March 6 – Philip Sheridan, American general (d. 1888)
 March 12 – Clement Studebaker, American automobile pioneer (d. 1901)
 March 16 – Elise Hwasser, Swedish actress (d. 1894)
 April 3 – Adelaide of Löwenstein-Wertheim-Rosenberg, Queen consort of Portugal (d. 1909)
 April 6 – Nire Kagenori, Japanese admiral (d. 1900)
 April 19 – Mary Louise Booth, American writer, editor and translator (d. 1889)
 May 7 – Richard Norman Shaw, British architect (d. 1912)
 June 1 – John Bell Hood, American Confederate general (d. 1879)
 June 2 – Jan Gerard Palm, Curaçao-born composer (d. 1906)
 June 7 – Amelia Edwards, English journalist and author (d. 1892)
 June 13 – James Clerk Maxwell, Scottish physicist (d. 1879)
 June 28 – Joseph Joachim, Austrian violinist (d. 1907)

July–December 

 July 8 – John Pemberton, American inventor of Coca-Cola (d. 1888)
 July 9 – Wilhelm His Sr., Swiss anatomist (d. 1904)
 July 17 – Xianfeng Emperor of China (d. 1861)
 July 22 – Emperor Kōmei of Japan (d. 1867)
 August 12 – Helena Blavatsky, Russian-born author, theosophist (d. 1891)
 August 16 – Ebenezer Cobb Morley, English sportsman and the father of modern football (d. 1924)
 August 20 – Eduard Suess, Austrian geologist (d. 1914)
 August 28 – Lucy Webb Hayes, First Lady of the United States (d. 1889)
 September 3 – States Rights Gist, Confederate Brigadier General in the American Civil War (d. 1864)
 September 8 – Wilhelm Raabe, German novelist (d. 1910)
 September 18 – Siegfried Marcus, German-born automobile pioneer (d. 1898)
 September 20 – Kate Harrington, American teacher, writer and poet (d. 1917)
 September 29 – John Schofield, American general (d. 1906)
 October 6 – Richard Dedekind, German mathematician (d. 1916)
 October 14 – Samuel W. Johnson, English railway mechanical engineer (d. 1912)
 October 16 – Lucy Stanton, American abolitionist (d. 1910)
 October 18 – Frederick III, German Emperor (d. 1888)
 October 29 – Othniel Charles Marsh, American paleontologist (d. 1899)
 October 31
Paolo Mantegazza, Italian neurologist, physiologist, anthropologist and fiction writer (d. 1910)
Romualdo Pacheco, Governor of California (d. 1899)
 November 1 – Harry Atkinson, 10th Premier of New Zealand (d. 1892)
 November 5 – Anna Leonowens, Anglo-Indian educator (Anna of The King and I) (d. 1915)
 November 7 – Mélanie Calvat, French Roman Catholic nun, Marian Visionary, canonized (d. 1904)
 November 19 – James A. Garfield, 20th President of the United States (d. 1881)
 December 1 – Princess Maria Amélia of Brazil, daughter of Emperor Pedro I of Brazil (d. 1853)
 December 14 – Arsenio Martínez Campos, Spanish general, revolutionary and prime minister (d. 1900)
 December 19 – Bernice Pauahi Bishop, Hawaiian aliʻi (d. 1884)

Date unknown 
 Jacob W. Davis, (b. Jacob Youphes), Latvian-born American tailor, inventor of jeans (d. 1908)
 Sotirios Sotiropoulos, Greek economist, politician (d. 1898)
 Eugenia Kisimova, Bulgarian feminist, philanthropist, women's rights activist (d. 1885)

Deaths

January–June 

 January 8 – Franz Krommer, Czech composer (b. 1759)
 January 21 – Ludwig Achim von Arnim, German poet (b. 1781)
 February 2 – Vincenzo Dimech, Maltese sculptor (b. 1768)
 February 14
 Vicente Guerrero, 2nd President of Mexico, Independence War hero (b. 1782)
 Marye of Yejju, Ethiopian Ras
 Sabagadis, Ethiopian warlord (b. c. 1770)
 February 17 – Friedrich Wilhelm, Duke of Schleswig-Holstein-Sonderburg-Glücksburg (b. 1785)
 March 9 – Friedrich Maximilian Klinger, German writer (b. 1752)
 April 5 – Dmitry Senyavin, Russian admiral (b. 1763)
 April 20 – John Abernethy, English surgeon (b. 1764)
 April 21 – Thursday October Christian I, Pitcairn Islander and son of Fletcher Christian (b. 1790)
 April 27 – Charles Felix of Sardinia, King of Sardinia (b. 1765)
 April 30 – Collet Barker, British military officer, explorer (b. 1784)
 May 17 – Nathaniel Rochester, American politician (b. 1752)
 June 5 – Tarenorerer, indigenous Australian Tasman freedom fighter (b. 1800)

 June 6 – Robert Fullerton, governor of Penang, first governor of British Straits Settlements (b. 1773)
 June 8 – Sarah Siddons, English actress (b. 1755)
 June 27 – Sophie Germain, French mathematician (b. 1776)
 June 30 – William Roscoe, English abolitionist and writer (b. 1753)

July–December 

 July 4 – James Monroe, 73, 5th President of the United States (b. 1758)
 July 16 – Louis Alexandre Andrault de Langeron, Russian general (b. 1763)
 July 20 – Jacques Defermon des Chapelieres, French politician (b. 1752)
 August 5 – Sébastien Érard, German-born French instrument maker (b. 1752)
 August 24 – August von Gneisenau, Prussian field marshal (b. 1760)
 September 28 – Philippine Engelhard, German writer, scholar (b. 1756) 
 November 6 – Hilchen Sommerschild, Norwegian educator (b. 1756)
 November 11 – Nat Turner, American slave rebel (b. 1800)
 November 14 – Georg Hegel, German philosopher (b. 1770)
 November 16 – Carl von Clausewitz, German military strategist (b. 1780)
 November 19 – Titumir, Bengali revolutionary (b. 1782)
 November 21 – Marie Anne Simonis, Belgian textile industrialist (b. 1758)
 December 15 – Hannah Adams, American author (b. 1755)
 December 18 – Willem Bilderdijk, Dutch author (b. 1756)
 December 23 – Emilia Plater, Polish heroine (b. 1806) 
 December 26 
 Henry Louis Vivian Derozio, Indian poet (b. 1809)
 Stephen Girard, French-American banker (b. 1750)

Date unknown
 Marengo, Napoleon's mount in several battles (b. 1793)
 Charlotta Richardy, Swedish industrialist (b. 1751)

References